The 2015 Asian Men's U23 Volleyball Championship was held in Naypyidaw, Myanmar from 12 to 20 May 2015. It was the inaugural edition of the tournament and served as the Asian qualifier for the 2015 Men's U23 World Championship to be held in Dubai, United Arab Emirates which the top two teams qualified for the world championship. Iran won the tournament and Purya Fayazi was the most valuable player.

Pools composition
Teams were seeded in the first two positions of each pool following the Serpentine system according to their final standing of the 2014 Asian U20 Championship. AVC reserved the right to seed the hosts as head of pool A regardless of the final standing of the 2014 Asian U20 Championship. All teams not seeded were drawn. But, Afghanistan, Malaysia and Turkmenistan later withdrew. Final standing of the 2014 Asian U20 Championship are shown in brackets except the hosts who did not participate in the 2014 Asian U20 Championship.

Venues
 Wunna Theikdi Sports Complex – Hall B, Naypyidaw, Myanmar – Pool A, B and Final eight
 Wunna Theikdi Sports Complex – Hall C, Naypyidaw, Myanmar – Pool C, D and 9th–16th places

Pool standing procedure
 Number of matches won
 Match points
 Sets ratio
 Points ratio
 Result of the last match between the tied teams

Match won 3–0 or 3–1: 3 match points for the winner, 0 match points for the loser
Match won 3–2: 2 match points for the winner, 1 match point for the loser

Preliminary round
All times are Myanmar Standard Time (UTC+06:30).

Pool A

|}

|}

Pool B

|}

|}

Pool C

|}

|}

Pool D

|}

|}

Final round
All times are Myanmar Standard Time (UTC+06:30).
The first and third placed teams of each Preliminary Round pools were seeded in Quarterfinals and 9th–16th Quarterfinals respectively. The second and fourth placed teams of each Preliminary Round pools were drawn to match the first and third placed teams respectively. The teams in same pool in Preliminary Round didn't play each other in Quarterfinals and 9th–16th Quarterfinals.

9th–16th places

9th–16th quarterfinals

|}

13th–16th semifinals

|}

9th–12th semifinals

|}

15th place match

|}

13th place match

|}

11th place match

|}

9th place match

|}

Final eight

Quarterfinals

|}

5th–8th semifinals

|}

Semifinals

|}

7th place match

|}

5th place match

|}

3rd place match

|}

Final

|}

Final standing

Awards

Most Valuable Player
  Purya Fayazi
Best Setter
  Mostafa Bagheri
Best Outside Spikers
  Purya Fayazi
  Liu Hung-Min

Best Middle Blockers
  Kim In-hyeok
  Javad Hosseinabadi
Best Opposite Spiker
  Jung Ji-seok
Best Libero
  Lee Ji-hun

See also
2015 Asian Women's U23 Volleyball Championship

References

External links
Official website
Regulations
Squads

U23, 2015
Asian U23 Men's Volleyball Championship
2015 in Burmese sport
Volleyball in Myanmar
International sports competitions hosted by Myanmar
21st century in Naypyidaw